Danuta Hojarska, née Gąsiorek (born 2 January 1960 in Malbork) is a Polish politician. She was elected to the Sejm on 25 September 2005, getting 10155 votes in 25 Gdańsk district as a candidate from Samoobrona Rzeczpospolitej Polskiej list.

She was also a member of Sejm 2001-2005.

See also
Members of Polish Sejm 2005-2007

External links
Danuta Hojarska - parliamentary page - includes declarations of interest, voting record, and transcripts of speeches.

1960 births
Living people
People from Malbork
Members of the Polish Sejm 2005–2007
Members of the Polish Sejm 2001–2005
Women members of the Sejm of the Republic of Poland
Self-Defence of the Republic of Poland politicians
21st-century Polish women politicians